Nokomis East is a group of neighborhoods in the southeastern corner of Minneapolis, Minnesota, United States. It consists of four neighborhoods: Keewaydin, Minnehaha, Morris Park and Wenonah.  Nokomis East contains two schools, the Nokomis Community Library, and a post office.  On its western edge is Lake Nokomis, for which it is named. Two regional parks (Minnehaha and Lake Nokomis), and three neighborhood parks, (Keewaydin, Bossen Field and Morris Park) provide recreation and educational programming for all age groups. Seven churches serve residents of various denominations. Nokomis East is served by the Nokomis East Neighborhood Association (NENA). The main transportation corridors are the neighborhood boundaries: Cedar Avenue, 34th and 28th Avenues, 50th and 54th Streets, Hwy 55 (Hiawatha Avenue), and Crosstown highway 62.

History 
Until 1880, an American Indian Village was located between Lake Nokomis and Lake Hiawatha, in the vicinity of the current Nokomis Community Center. Rail transit and a depot were established near the neighborhood as early as 1865.

Nokomis East Neighborhood Association 

The Nokomis East Neighborhood Association is a neighborhood association that is serving the Nokomis East neighborhoods of South Minneapolis, Minnesota, United States. The association is led by a 15 member board of directors drawn from the neighborhoods that comprise Nokomis East. The Nokomis East area consists of four smaller neighborhoods: Wenonah, Keewaydin, Morris Park, and Minnehaha. The current Chair of the Nokomis East Neighborhood Association is Jerome Evans.

History 
Nokomis East Neighborhood was established in about 1988 with the goal of revitalizing and improving the neighborhood. In 1998, the association voted and ratified, and was approved, to be the recipient of Nokomis East's Neighborhood Revitalization Program (NRP) funds.

The neighborhood association has been responsible for many different projects and programs ranging from neighborhood planning to environment to housing to safety. These have included a commercial facade improvement program, tree planting along the Minnehaha Creek and Lake Nokomis, Earth Day cleanups of greenspaces, and the distribution of Children First grants.

The Nokomis East Neighborhood Association has two paid employees. The rest of the organization is made up of volunteers who live or work in the neighborhood. This includes the association's many committees, which each focus on different areas for improvement. Additionally, a board oversees the operations of the group. In October 2014, the organization's two staff members were laid off. Following a "transitional year" in 2015 which a new executive director and program and communications manager were hired, as well as a community organizer, the neighborhood association moved its offices. The owners of the old building, at 3000 East 50th Street, in which the offices had been housed for 21 years, sold it and the neighborhood association made its way to a new office near the corner of 54th Street and 43rd Avenue South.

Events 

The neighborhood association hosts six to ten town meetings per year. These have included meetings with property developers and discussions about significant neighborhood happenings, such as the renovation of the Nokomis Library. In April or May, the Nokomis East Neighborhood Association usually hosts a neighborhood meeting to update the public on its affairs and those of the neighborhood, and deliver its annual report. The 2008 neighborhood meeting featured state senator Patricia Torres Ray as the keynote speaker.

On December 30, the neighborhood association holds a Night Before New Year's Eve Celebration with family games, music, crafts and horse-drawn hayrides. New Year's is celebrated at 8:00pm, instead of midnight.

April fools 
Every April Fool's Day, fictitious stories written as news articles are posted on the association's website. Usually, they involve local topics, such as the METRO Blue Line or Lake Nokomis. One such story, released in 2006, supposed that bull sharks had been pushed up the Mississippi River and into the Minnehaha Creek after hurricanes Katrina and Rita. The story was picked up by online forums, websites and word of mouth, and at one point was averaging almost 1,000 views a day.

References

Neighborhoods in Minneapolis